The Indogermanisches etymologisches Wörterbuch (IEW; "Indo-European Etymological Dictionary") was published in 1959 by the Austrian-German comparative linguist and Celtic languages expert Julius Pokorny. It is an updated and slimmed-down reworking of the three-volume Vergleichendes Wörterbuch der indogermanischen Sprachen (1927–1932, by Alois Walde and Julius Pokorny).

Both of these works aim to provide an overview of the lexical knowledge of the Proto-Indo-European language accumulated through the early 20th century. The IEW is now significantly outdated, especially as it was conservative even when it was written, ignoring the now integral laryngeal theory, and hardly including any Anatolian material.

Editions
French & European Publications (1969), 
Francke 4th ed. (2002), 5th ed. (2005),

See also 
 Proto-Indo-European language
 Proto-Indo-European root

Other Proto-Indo-European language dictionaries and grammars
 Grundriß der vergleichenden Grammatik der indogermanischen Sprachen (published 1886–1916 by Karl Brugmann and Berthold Delbrück)
 Lexikon der indogermanischen Verben (LIV, published 1998 and 2001 by Helmut Rix and others)
 Indo-European Etymological Dictionary, an ongoing project based in Leiden, intended to result in the publication of a comprehensive Indo-European etymological dictionary and described by its authors as a successor of the IEW

External links

 Indogermanisches etymologisches Wörterbuch by Julius Pokorny (English translation)
Indogermanisches etymologisches Wörterbuch by Julius Pokorny (Eindhoven University of Technology) 
Indogermanisches Wörterbuch by Gerhard Köbler (based on the IEW, but includes laryngeals as well as Tocharian and Anatolian material, and a short grammar and an English–Indo-European dictionary) 

1959 non-fiction books
Etymological dictionaries
Indo-European linguistics works